Nyasha Gwanzura (born 14 January 1996) is a Zimbabwean cricketer who plays for the Zimbabwe women's national cricket team.

In August 2021, Gwanzura was named in Zimbabwe's Women's Twenty20 International (WT20I) squad for their three-match series against Thailand. She made her WT20I debut on 30 August 2021, for Zimbabwe against Thailand. In October 2021, Gwanzura was named in Zimbabwe's Women's One Day International (WODI) squad for their four-match series against Ireland. The fixtures were the first WODI matches after Zimbabwe also gained WODI status from the International Cricket Council (ICC) in April 2021. She made her WODI debut on 9 October 2021, for Zimbabwe against Ireland.

In November 2021, she was named in Zimbabwe's team for the 2021 Women's Cricket World Cup Qualifier tournament in Zimbabwe.

References

External links

1996 births
Living people
Zimbabwean women cricketers
Zimbabwe women One Day International cricketers
Zimbabwe women Twenty20 International cricketers
Place of birth missing (living people)
Mountaineers women cricketers